Eagleton School was a residential treatment facility located in Great Barrington, Massachusetts for boys ages 9–22 who have a variety of emotional and behavioral problems. It was privately owned by Bruce Bona. It was the host of the Great Barrington Christmas party.

1995 Tornado

Two students and one staff member were killed in the 1995 Great Barrington tornado when their van was picked up by the tornado and thrown 1,000 feet into a wooded ditch. Reports say that the occupants were not strapped in and that no redirection was given for the students to put on their seat belts. Subsequently, the victim's families sued the school but charges were later dropped. A chapel was built onsite to honor those who died.

2016 assault case and closure
In January 2016, five employees were charged with an assault on a student. Four additional staff were also fired for abusive actions. As result of the incident, the school's license to operate was revoked by the Commonwealth of Massachusetts, and the school shut down in April, 2016.

References

Boarding schools in Massachusetts
Educational institutions in the United States with year of establishment missing
Great Barrington, Massachusetts
Private schools in Massachusetts
Schools in Berkshire County, Massachusetts
Therapeutic boarding schools in the United States